Yousef Khateri (born 16 December 1971) was an amateur boxer from Iran, who competed in the 1992 Summer Olympics in the welterweight (67 kg) division and lost in the first round to Arkhom Chenglai of Thailand.

References

External links
 

1971 births
Living people
Iranian male boxers
Olympic boxers of Iran
Boxers at the 1992 Summer Olympics
Welterweight boxers